Az Much Ass Azz U Want is one of two extended play albums by American female rap group H.W.A. The EP was released on February 22, 1994 under Ruthless Records and was produced by Cold 187um, Mista Choc, DJ Yella and Rhythum D, with executive production by Eazy-E. Due to the record being both a critical and commercial failure, only making it to #71 on the Top R&B/Hip-Hop Albums and #33 on the Top Heatseekers album charts, the group disbanded later the same year. One single was released, "All That (Juzt A Little Action)", but it did not make it on any album charts. The music video received heavy airplay and featured an appearance by Eazy-E.

Track listing
Adapted from Discogs

Note
"Hoe I Am" sampled "I'm A Ho" by Whodini (1986)

Personnel

Antoine Carraby - producer (track 5)
Vince Edwards - songwriter (tracks 1, 7)
Mario “Mista Choc”Johnson - producer (tracks 1, 5-7), co-producer (track 3)
Kim Kenner - main performer
Jerry Long Jr. - additional vocals (track 4)
Mark Paladino - mixing (tracks 1, 3, 6)
Donovan Smith - mixing (track 2)
David Weldon - producer & mixing (track 2)
Eric Wright - executive producer
B.O.X. - songwriter (tracks 2-3, 5, 7)

References

1994 EPs
Hip hop EPs
H.W.A. albums
Ruthless Records EPs
Albums produced by DJ Yella
Albums produced by Rhythum D
Albums produced by Cold 187um